Coupeville School District 204 is a public school district headquartered in Coupeville, Washington, United States.  It serves the central portion of Whidbey Island.  As of May 2011, the district has an enrollment of 1,069 students.

Schools
The district operates three schools and four educational programs.
 Coupeville Elementary
 Coupeville Middle School
 Coupeville High School
 Island County Juvenile Detention Education, a school within the Island County Juvenile Detention Center
 Coupeville Community Education

References

External links
 
 
School districts in Washington (state)
Education in Island County, Washington

Notable Alumni: Michael Laska, adult cinema director